2,3-Dichloro-5,6-dicyano-1,4-benzoquinone (or DDQ) is the chemical reagent with formula C6Cl2(CN)2O2. This oxidant is useful for the dehydrogenation of alcohols, phenols, and steroid ketones. DDQ decomposes in water, but is stable in aqueous mineral acid.

Preparation
Synthesis of DDQ involves cyanation of chloranil. J. Thiele and F. Günther first reported a 6-step preparation in 1906. The substance did not receive interest until its potential as a dehydrogenation agent was discovered. A single-step chlorination from 2,3-dicyanohydroquinone was reported in 1965.

Reactions
The reagent removes pairs of H atoms from organic molecules.  The stoichiometry of its action is illustrated by the conversion of tetralin to naphthalene:
2 C6Cl2(CN)2O2 + C10H12 → 2 C6Cl2(CN)2(OH)2 + C10H8

The resulting hydroquinone is poorly soluble in typical reaction solvents (dioxane, benzene, alkanes), which facilitates workup.

Solutions of DDQ in benzene are red, due to the formation of a charge-transfer complex.

Dehydrogenation

Aromatization

Cross-Dehydrogenative Coupling

Safety
DDQ reacts with water to release highly toxic hydrogen cyanide (HCN). A low-temperature and weakly acidic environment increases the stability of DDQ.

References

External links
 "Like Neurons in the Brain": A Molecular Computer that Evolves

Nitriles
Organochlorides
1,4-Benzoquinones
Oxidizing agents
Reagents for organic chemistry